Twysden is a surname. Notable people with the surname include:

Anne Twysden (1574–1638), English writer
Philip Twysden (1713–1752), Anglican clergyman
Roger Twysden (1597–1672), English historian and politician
William Twysden (disambiguation), multiple people
Twysden baronets